

England

Head coach: Martin Green

 Rob Andrew
 Stuart Barnes
 Steve Brain
 Gareth Chilcott
 Maurice Colclough
 Fran Clough
 Huw Davies
 Wade Dooley
 Jon Hall
 Simon Halliday
 Mike Harrison
 Richard Hill
 Nigel Melville (c.)
 John Palmer
 Gary Pearce
 Nigel Redman
 Paul Rendall
 Dean Richards
 Graham Robbins
 Jamie Salmon
 Kevin Simms
 Simon Smith
 Rory Underwood
 Peter Winterbottom

France

Head coach: Jacques Fouroux

 Pierre Berbizier
 Éric Bonneval
 Serge Blanco
 Pierre Chadebech
 Denis Charvet
 Jean Condom
 Daniel Dubroca (c.)
 Dominique Erbani
 Patrick Estève
 Jean-Pierre Garuet-Lempirou
 Jacques Gratton
 Francis Haget
 Jean-Luc Joinel
 Guy Laporte
 Jean-Baptiste Lafond
 Philippe Marocco
 Philippe Sella

Ireland

Head coach: Mick Doyle

 Willie Anderson
 Michael Bradley
 Nigel Carr
 Keith Crossan
 Paul Dean
 Moss Finn
 Ciaran Fitzgerald (c.)
 Des Fitzgerald
 Jerry Holland
 Ronan Kearney
 Paul Kennedy
 Ralph Keyes
 Michael Kiernan
 Donal Lenihan
 Hugo MacNeill
 Brian McCall
 J. J. McCoy
 Robert Morrow
 Brendan Mullin
 Phil Orr
 Trevor Ringland
 Brian Spillane
 Tony Ward

Scotland

Head coach: Derrick Grant

 Roger Baird
 John Beattie
 Alex Brewster
 Finlay Calder
 Alister Campbell
 Jeremy Campbell-Lamerton
 Colin Deans (c.)
 Matt Duncan
 Gavin Hastings
 Scott Hastings
 John Jeffrey
 David Johnston
 Roy Laidlaw
 Iain Milne
 Iain Paxton
 Keith Robertson
 John Rutherford
 David Sole

Wales

Head coach: Tony Gray

 Bleddyn Bowen
 Mark Brown
 Jonathan Davies
 Phil Davies
 John Devereux
 Ian Eidman
 Adrian Hadley
 Billy James
 Robert Jones
 Phil Lewis
 Paul Moriarty
 John Perkins
 Dai Pickering (c.)
 Paul Thorburn
 Mark Titley
 David Waters
 Jeff Whitefoot

External links
1986 Five Nations Championship Statistics

Six Nations Championship squads